Saint Joseph's University (SJU or St. Joe's) is a private Jesuit university in Philadelphia and Lower Merion, Pennsylvania. The university was founded by the Society of Jesus in 1851 as Saint Joseph's College. Saint Joseph's is the seventh oldest Jesuit university in the United States, one of 27 member institutions of the Association of Jesuit Colleges and Universities, and the fourth largest university in Philadelphia. It is named after the earthly father of Jesus, Saint Joseph. On June 1, 2022, Saint Joseph's University acquired University of the Sciences (a/k/a USciences and f/k/a Philadelphia College of Pharmacy), adding professional programs in health and science, including occupational therapy, physical therapy, pharmacy and physician assistant (as USciences had offered more than 30 degree and certification programs across a wide range of pharmaceutical and healthcare-related disciplines.). SJU can now trace its history to February of 1821 when Philadelphia College of Pharmacy was conceived by 68 apothecaries who met in Philadelphia's Carpenters' Hall to establish improved scientific standards and to develop programs to train more competent apprentices and students. The apothecaries formalized their new association of pharmacists through a constitution, which declared their intent to establish a school of pharmacy to enhance their vocation and to "guard the drug market from the introduction of spurious, adulterated, deteriorated or otherwise mischievous articles, which are too frequently forced into it". Philadelphia College of Pharmacy was chartered in 1822, making it (and now SJU) the first institution of higher learning in the United States dedicated to the field of pharmacy.

Saint Joseph's University presently (as a result of merger with USciences) educates nearly 9,000 undergraduate, graduate, and doctoral students each year.. The university offers over 135 undergraduate programs, 77 graduate programs, 9 adult learner programs, and experiential learning options, including cooperative education, internships, clinical rotations, Summer Scholars and an Ed.D. in Educational Leadership. It has 14 centers and institutes, including the Kinney Center for Autism Education and Support and the Pedro Arrupe, S.J., Center for Business Ethics.

Saint Joseph's athletics teams, the Hawks, are an NCAA Division I program, competing in the Atlantic-10 Conference and Philadelphia's Big 5. The official colors of the university are crimson and gray. The school mascot is The Hawk which never stops flapping its wings while in costume.

Jesuit and Catholic identity

Approximately 38 Jesuits live on campus with 10 serving as faculty. The university's Jesuit community lives in the Loyola Center, directly across the street from Barbelin Hall. The Loyola Center joins Manresa Hall, the infirmary for Jesuits. The property features the Ziff Carriage House, which serves as a meeting place and guest house. Other Jesuit residences include St. Alphonsus House (at 5800 Overbrook Avenue) and Faber Hall (39 Berwick Road). One Jesuit lives in a residence hall; the lay university president maintains an apartment in the Merion Gardens Apartment building.

The university extensively uses its Jesuit identity in its branding. It began the Magis ("greater") campaign in 2013 to highlight commitment to living "For the greater glory of God" (Ad maiorem Dei gloriam), the motto of the Society of Jesus.

SJU also promotes the Jesuit principle of cura personalis or "care for the whole person." Undergraduates must complete a general education program that focuses heavily on traditional liberal arts disciplines. Every general education class is titled "154", which stands for the year AD 1540 when the Society of Jesus was accepted by the Pope.

On September 27, 2015, Pope Francis, a Jesuit, made a stop at the university during his two-day visit to Philadelphia.

Seal
The Seal of Saint Joseph's University signifies its history and values. Other Jesuit educational institutions share three of these symbols. The wolves over a kettle pot show the generosity of the Loyola family towards the poor. Tradition claims that the Loyolas provided so much food for their soldiers that even the wolves had enough to eat. IHS are the first three letters of the name of Jesus in Greek, and the historic monogram of the Society of Jesus. The stripes signify the 7 sons of the House of Loyola, who died defending their home. The lily is the distinguishing symbol of the university, honoring Saint Joseph, the school's patron saint. The seal is the graphical representation of Saint Joseph's and its Jesuit identity.

Presidents

On March 10, 2023 Saint Joseph’s University’s Board of Trustees elected Cheryl A. McConnell, PhD, its 29th – and first female– president in the University’s 172-year history, effective immediately. Dr. McConnell is a 35-year veteran of Jesuit higher education, having most recently served as Saint Joseph’s interim president since last June, and as provost and chief academic officer for three years prior.

Academics
The university has four schools and colleges (identified at bottom of this section and detailed in subsequent sections) that offer 224 academic programs (including 62 undergraduate day majors and 72 minors,  77 graduate programs, 4 health profession programs (with online options), and 9 degree-completion and post-baccalaureate certificate program).

According to Niche (the ranking and review site for colleges, Saint Joseph’s top four majors of interest for the Class of 2023 are: business, psychology, pre-med, and biology.

All Saint Joseph's University undergraduate students complete coursework through the General Education Program (GEP) focused in four main areas: signature core, variable, integrative learning, and overlay courses. In addition, all students are required to complete a first-year seminar. Major coursework includes classes in English composition and literature, mathematics, natural science, philosophy, theology and religious studies, social science, world languages, and history. The courses are intended to be aligned with Jesuit ideals of social justice, service learning, ethics, and real-world application of theory. The GEP is the result of a university-wide curriculum overhaul implemented in the fall of 2010.

4+1 programs are accelerated bachelor’s/master’s programs that allow students to start earning a graduate degree in their senior year. Saint Joseph's University offers a direct-entry admission pathway to health professions programs in occupational therapy, physical therapy and pharmacy. This option allows students to enter the program directly from high school and transition to the professional phase of the program by meeting all academic criteria and program requirements.

Of tenure-track faculty, 99% hold the highest possible degrees in their fields. The 2008 graduation rate was 90% and the freshman retention rate for the Class of 2017 is 89.8%. About 51% of undergraduates are enrolled in the College of Arts and Sciences while 49% are enrolled in the Haub School of Business. The Carnegie Classification of Institutions of Higher Education classified Saint Joseph's among "Master's Colleges and Universities (larger programs)".

The university also has 14 centers and institutes, which include the Academy of Food Marketing, The Barnes Arboretum at Saint Joseph’s University, Center for Addiction and Recovery Education, Center for Professional Development, Faith-Justice Institute, Institute for Environmental Stewardship, Institute for Jewish-Catholic Relations, Institute of Clinical Bioethics, Kinney Center for Autism Education and Support, Maguire Academy of Insurance and Risk Management, Pedro Arrupe, S.J., Center for Business Ethics, Philadelphia Regional Institute for STEM Educators and Substance Use Disorders Institute.

The university's four schools and colleges:
 College of Arts & Sciences
 Haub School of Business
 School of Health Professions, home of College of Pharmacy
 School of Education and Human Development
are detailed on subsequent sections.

College of Arts & Sciences 
The College of Arts and Sciences offers undergraduate, graduate/professional and adult learner programs in three departments: humanities, natural sciences/mathematics and social science.

The Jesuit Catholic educational model centers on the tradition of creating “people with and for others,” encouraging students to reflect upon complex social justice issues and seek to make meaningful contributions to the world.

Undergraduate students engage in experiential learning opportunities like self-directed and faculty-partnered research projects, service learning, co-ops and internships and study abroad. They engage with community partners and get hands-on experience in the University’s centers such as the Institute for Environmental Stewardship.

The McNulty Program for Leadership in Science and Mathematics aims to provide women in STEM fields extensive undergraduate research and mentorship, awarding full and associate level scholarships each year. The Summer Scholars Program awards competitive grants to students every summer to engage in research and creative projects under faculty mentorship.

Erivan K. Haub School of Business 
The Erivan K. Haub School of Business is AACSB-accredited and nationally ranked for its undergraduate, graduate and certificate programs. The curriculum is distinguished by a liberal arts foundation central to the Jesuit model of education, paired with industry-focused degree programs. Experiential learning in the form of internships, cooperative education and service-learning is a component of many of the degree programs.

Haub School offers a 36-credit stackable MBA, as well as industry-focused MBAs in food marketing, pharmaceutical and healthcare marketing and an Executive MBA.

The school’s centers and institutes include the Maguire Academy of Insurance and Risk Management, the Academy of Food Marketing, Center for Professional Development and Pedro Arrupe, S.J., Center for Business Ethics.

The Haub School is one of 35 schools to receive the distinction of Bloomberg Experiential Learning Partner. The Haub Innovation lab is an on-campus incubator, offering workshops and faculty mentorship. The Wall Street Trading Room provides data and analytical tools for trading simulations. The SDG Dashboard is a data analytics platform to report and share best practice impacts on the United Nations’ Sustainable Development Goals (SDGs).

National Rankings

 Best Online Programs (undergraduate business, MBA program and Business, non-MBA), U.S. News & World Report 2022
 Best Business Programs, Undergraduate (accounting, business analytics, insurance, marketing), U.S. News & World Report 2022
 Best Business Programs, Graduate (business analytics, Executive MBA, finance, marketing), U.S. News & World Report 2022
 Best Business Schools (Top Online MBA), The Princeton Review, 2022
 Tier One Programs, Global MBA Rankings The CEO Magazine, 2022
 Best Online MBA Programs, Fortune Education, 2022

School of Health Professions 
The School of Health Professions offers a portfolio of accredited programs such as occupational therapy, physical therapy, physician assistant studies and pharmacy. The School offers students opportunities for interdisciplinary research and community outreach, or “reflection and action,” a tenet of the Jesuit model of education.

The School of Health Professions is home to the Philadelphia College of Pharmacy[LINK], North America’s first college of pharmacy, and educates students in pharmacy practice, research and education.

SHP students are trained using state-of-the-art equipment in on-campus laboratories and facilities:

 Industrial Pharmacy Lab (IPHL)
 Integrated Professional Education Complex (IPEX)
 McNeil Graduate Research Center & Pharmacology/Toxicology Center
 McNeil Research Center
 Motion Analysis Laboratory
 Patricia Leahy Memorial Research Laboratory
 BTE Technologies ™ Rehabilitation Research Laboratory
 West Center for Computational Chemistry and Drug Design

Through the School’s affiliations and partnerships with major healthcare providers throughout the Philadelphia region and across the country, students gain hands-on experience in clinical rotations, community service and research.

Undergraduate degrees include Exercise Physiology and Health Science, and Bachelor of Science degrees with direct-entry pathways to Occupational Therapy (DrOT), Pharmacy (PharmD), and Physical Therapy (DPT).

Graduate and doctoral degree programs include Doctor of Occupational Therapy (DrOT), Doctor of Pharmacy (PharmD), Doctor of Physical Therapy (DPT), Master of Occupational Therapy (MOT), Master of Science degrees in Pharmaceutics, Pharmacology and Toxicology, Physician Assistant Studies (MSPAS), and PhD degrees in Pharmaceutics and Pharmacology and Toxicology.

School of Education and Human Development 
Rooted in the Jesuit tradition of cura personalis – care of the whole person – the School’s curricula invites interdisciplinary study and encourages future educators to understand the physical, social, emotional, behavioral, cognitive and economic health of the students and communities they serve, as well the related societal, systems and policy issues impacting human development and educational and socioeconomic outcomes.

The School offers students exposure to expert faculty, critical thinking and inquiry, the latest research and industry best practices.

Outside of the classroom, students engage in hands-on opportunities such as urban teaching initiatives, service-learning programs, research and clinical practicums with community partners, school districts and healthcare facilities.

Centers and Partnerships include The Alliance for Catholic Education at Saint Joseph’s University (ACESJU), The Center for Addiction and Recovery Education (CARE), collaboration with Samuel Gompers Elementary School (a K-8 school in Wynnefield, Philadelphia), and Kinney Center for Autism Education and Support. The Kinney Center is a community-facing service, education and research organization that services individuals with autism spectrum disorder across their lifespan; supports their caregivers and educates those who will play a critical role in the field of autism.

Honors program 
The university has an undergraduate honors program, housed in Claver House.

Campus

Saint Joseph's University's campus, often referred to as Hawk Hill, is located on City Avenue, which splits the university between the western edge of Philadelphia and Lower Merion Township. Portions of the property are in the Lower Merion side.

The university's official mailing address is in Philadelphia. A bridge that spans City Avenue connects the two sides of the campus. Its  are concentrated from Cardinal Avenue to 52nd Street and Overbrook Avenue to City Avenue. The university also owns several buildings that are not on the main campus. In all, there are 92 buildings on the university's campus.

St. Joe's is within  of La Salle University, Harcum College, Rosemont College, Philadelphia College of Osteopathic Medicine, University of Pennsylvania, Drexel University, Temple University, Swarthmore College, Bryn Mawr College, Haverford College, Philadelphia University, Eastern University, Cabrini College, and Villanova University. SEPTA regional rail train stations on each side of campus provide students with easy access to Center City.

Main campus
The main campus is located on the Philadelphia side of City Avenue between Cardinal and Overbrook Avenues and 52nd Street, and is the original location of the university when it moved to City Avenue in 1927. Saint Joseph's most recognizable building is Barbelin Hall, opened in 1927. The hall is known for its Gothic architecture, particularly the gargoyles that mark what is called the Barbelin Quadrangle (or Barbelin Courtyard) and the tall, four-spired bell tower that can be seen from miles away. The bell tower that sits atop Barbelin served as the university's logo for several years. Barbelin Hall was built by John McShain who would later go on to construct many buildings in Washington, D.C., such as The Pentagon and The Jefferson Memorial.

Main campus contains the majority of academic buildings, first-year residence halls, and campus houses. Barbelin (College of Arts & Sciences), Mandeville (Haub School of Business), Bellarmine, Post, and Science Center comprise the main academic halls. Campus houses are a prominent feature of main campus serving as departmental offices for fine arts (Boland Hall), communication studies (Bronstein Hall), and the president and provost (Regis Hall), as well as several housing options for first-year students and upperclassmen. Green spaces on campus include St. Mary's, Claver House, and Wolfington lawns located on the Main Campus, in addition to two quadrangles, College Hall Quad and Barbelin Quad.

The Post Academic Center is the university's main library, the result of a renovation of the original Francis A. Drexel Library and an expansion project called the Post Learning Commons, from 2011 to 2013. Drexel Library and Post Learning Commons are connected via a glass atrium and bridge through the heart of campus. Post Academic Center houses approximately 355,000 volumes, 1,450 print journals, 15,000 full-text electronic journals, 2,800 e-books, 866,000 microforms, and 4,975 audio-visual materials. Unique to the Post Academic Center is the Campbell Collection in Food Marketing.

Campion Student Center is the hub for student activities, student life administrative offices, and dining facilities. The building was renovated in 2008 and now includes the main dining hall; a food court featuring Grille Works, Subway, and Hawk Wrap; and the C-Store. The student center also features the Doyle Banquet Halls, Forum Theater, and President's Lounge used for larger gatherings and lectures on campus. Located just off Campion Student Center is Simpson Hall, which houses the Student Media Center and The Perch, a 24-hour student lounge.

In September 2012, the university purchased the adjacent Cardinal's Residence on 54th and Cardinal Avenue from the Archdiocese of Philadelphia. Beginning with the fall 2014 semester, the Cardinal's Residence was renamed 5800 City Ave. It serves as a welcome center for prospective families and has offices for all enrollment management operations.

James J. Maguire '58 Campus
On August 8, 2008, Saint Joseph's completed the acquisition of the adjacent Episcopal Academy after purchasing the property in 2005. The new 38-acre area (150,000 m2) was named the Maguire Campus for the lead donor, Saint Joseph's alumnus James Maguire. The Maguire Campus is located directly across from the Main Campus on the Lower Merion side of City Avenue. The Maguire Campus features three main academic buildings: Merion Hall, Connelly Hall, and Toland Hall. Merion Hall is the largest of the three, and includes the University Gallery.

The Cardinal John Foley Center, a multi-use space, hosts lectures, concerts, and social gatherings, in addition to large-scale admission events. The Kinney Center for Autism Education and Support, established in 2009, was made possible with donations totaling over $8 million, and is located in Connelly Hall. Duperreault, Quinn, and Windrim Halls are campus houses serving as administrative space for University Advancement.

Athletic facilities include the Michael A. O'Pake, Esq. '61 Recreation Center, Ellen Ryan Field (field hockey), John Smithson Field (baseball), Curran Lawn, and a softball field.

Along with all of the buildings and fields, the Maguire Campus adds over 300 parking spaces for faculty and students, and a number of acres will be turned into green space. There are over 600 different species of trees on the Maguire Campus.

Overbrook Campus
The Overbrook Campus is located about a mile from and Main Campus, near Overbrook Train Station. Here also Saint Joseph's University owns buildings on both sides of City Avenue. Currently the campus holds six dorms, reserved exclusively for sophomores, juniors, and seniors. These dorms are Ashwood Apartments, Wynnewood Hall, Merion Gardens Apartments, Pennbrook Apartments, Morris Quad Townhouses, and Moore Hall. The campus also holds the Alumni House.

Although it is located about a mile from the main campus, Saint Joseph's University runs shuttles every 30 minutes (and 15 minutes during peak hours) to accommodate students.

Housing

Approximately 80% of students at Saint Joseph's live on campus. Housing options include residence halls, apartments, townhouses, and campus houses.

First-year students can choose from traditional residence halls (McShain Hall and Villiger Hall), suite-style residence halls (Sourin Residence Center and LaFarge Residence Center), or campus houses (Tara and Quirk Halls). Villiger Hall, the university's newest residence, opened in August 2012. All first-year housing options are located on the main campus. Sophomores, juniors, and seniors can choose to live in several campus houses or apartments. Additionally, by Fall 2022, the university is set to open a new residence hall specifically for students on the Autism spectrum.

Current developments and plans
During a presentation to the faculty in April 2013, President Kevin Gillespie, S.J., announced that, partially thanks to the popular Magis campaign, the university was beginning to expand, as it has a freshman class of 1,300 students enrolled for the fall of 2013. By 2017, it hoped to enroll 6,000 undergraduate students.

The university is heading into the final leg of its strategic plan, Plan 2020: Gateway to the Future, focused on increased academic distinction, facility enhancements, and endowment growth. The university has raised over $12.1 million and created 40 new scholarships under President Gillespie's Magis Scholarship Initiative. In 2023, St. Joseph's announced the acquisition of the Pennsylvania College of Health Sciences.

Larger campus enhancement projects include a new dining hall and black box theatre on Maguire Campus, and an expansion of Mandeville Hall currently on hold due to funding concerns.

Additional projects include an acquisition of the Arboretum of the Barnes Foundation, which is adjacent to the university's campus in Lower Merion Township. The proposed acquisition is currently pending in the Montgomery County Orphans' Court, and would be a significant addition to the university. Should this be accepted, the university would offer a horticulture minor program, as well as provide a fine arts gallery, including murals by famed artist Henri Matisse. This expansion has been largely possible due to a historical $50m gift made in 2017 by alumnus James Maguire ('58).

In March 2022, the university's planned merger with the University of the Sciences was approved by the Middle States Commission on Higher Education. The merger took effect on June 1, 2022, and university president Mark Reed told Axios he was not ruling out future mergers and acquisitions.

Student life

Demographics
Saint Joseph's 8,860 students come from all over the United States, with most from the Northeast, including Pennsylvania. Of these students 4,670 are traditional undergraduates, while the university's graduate and professional student population is numbered at 3,580.

The student body is 51.5% female and 48.5% male. The retention rate for Saint Joseph's is high, with about 88.3% of students returning for their sophomore year. 74% of students graduate within four years, due in part to the student-faculty ratio, which is 14:1. 39.7% of classes have fewer than 20 students.

Admissions
Saint Joseph's University is considered selective through its admission rate. The overall acceptance rate is 58.3%, with early action acceptance at 68.4%. The average freshman retention rate is 88.3%.

Of the Class of 2013, 94% were either employed, pursuing graduate studies, or involved in full-time volunteer programs within six months of graduation. The average starting salary was $48,400 for the Class of 2013, while the average graduate student from the Class of 2013 received $13,600 in scholarships.

Beginning with the Class of 2014 high school graduates, Saint Joseph's University is test optional. This means that it does not require applicants to submit SAT or ACT test scores, although applicants may choose to submit these scores. The university's program is a four-year test program that was scheduled to be reassessed in 2017.

In the summer of 2014, John Haller, associate provost for enrollment management at Saint Joseph's, discussed the progress of the SAT optional program. For the class of 2018, applications increased by 8 percent to 8,500. About 18 percent of those applicants chose not to submit test scores. Of the incoming fall 2014 freshman class of 1,350, one in five was admitted without having submitted test scores. Haller also noted that the average GPA for the class was identical to the previous year's class.

Organizations
Saint Joe's has 100 student organizations. It has 20 NCAA Division 1 Athletic programs, 30 clubs and intramural sports, and fitness programs. It competes in the Philadelphia City 6 Extramural Classics. The women's ice hockey team is a club sport at Saint Joe's, but is recognized by the Delaware Valley College Hockey Conference (DVCHC) as a Division III sport. Organizations include national fraternities and sororities; a radio station; two newspapers, The Hawk and the HawkEye; the Student Union Board; the Student Senate; and the Student Concert Committee. The Villiger Debating Society is the university's debating society.

Publications and media

Saint Joseph's University publishes the official alumni SJU Magazine three times a year. Standalone magazines are published once a year for the Haub School of Business (Haub School Review) and College of Arts and Sciences (Intellect). The Hawk, the university's student newspaper, is published weekly during the fall and spring semester. Students that take a class called news reporting is the writers in the hawk and also the members of the club are writers. The Hawk is fully run by students with help from the professors. This is a club and class that prepares you for journalism and editorial skills in the future. The Crimson and Gray Literary Magazine showcases the best of student fiction, poetry, and artwork in an annual publication; students and faculty may download the magazine for free (from the organization's website) or pick one up from select locations around campus. The Drexel Library has a newsletter called Library Lines. The Saint Joseph's University Press prints books and articles written by faculty and other authors.

Radio 1851 
Radio 1851 is Saint Joseph's University's student-run radio station and plays a variety of genres, including indie rock, rap/hip-hop, country, and electric dance music. The station began in 1922 as WSJR, the first college radio station to broadcast on AM, and moved to FM in the 80s.

Greek life 
Saint Joseph's University recognizes eight social Greek organizations and two co-educational, professional Greek organizations. Approximately 21% of undergraduates are affiliated with a social fraternity or sorority. No Greek housing is provided by the university.

Active social fraternities

Social sororities 

No sorority has ever been closed or otherwise dormant.

Professional and honorary fraternities

Athletics

Saint Joseph's University is the home of the Hawks, its athletics program. The school colors are crimson and gray. SJU fields teams in 20 varsity sports in Division I of the National Collegiate Athletic Association. The Hawks are part of the Atlantic 10 Conference. Since the Atlantic 10 does not support men's lacrosse, the Hawks play in the Northeast Conference for that sport only.

Along with the Atlantic 10, Saint Joseph's is a member of the Philadelphia Big 5, which intensifies local rivalries within Philadelphia city schools. Its effect on Saint Joseph's causes intense games with Temple University, Villanova University, the University of Pennsylvania, and inter-conference rival LaSalle University.

Saint Joseph's is also a member of the City 6. Similar to the Big 5, the City 6 comprises the entire Philadelphia Big 5 plus Drexel University, which did not participate in Division I athletics until 1973. In addition to official team rivalries, the local colleges also compete in various extramural sporting events to crown a City 6 Champion.

The Hawk mascot

One of the most famous mascots in college sports, the Saint Joseph's Hawk has been flapping its wings for over 50 years. Jim Brennan originated the idea for a hawk as mascot during the 1954–1955 season. Brennan, a former Marine and SJU cheerleader, at first wanted to secure an actual hawk, but later switched to the costume idea. The student government raised the $120 needed to buy the initial costume, which Brennan donned for three years. He made his debut as the Hawk on January 4, 1956, at a 69–56 win over La Salle University at the Palestra.

The Hawk is best known for staying in constant motion by flapping its wings throughout every basketball game, and for representing the Saint Joseph's motto, "The Hawk Will Never Die". It is also recognized by its "flying" in figure eights around the court during timeouts.

Men's basketball

While Saint Joseph's fields 20 NCAA sports, the university's most popular sport is men's basketball. Saint Joseph's has a rich basketball tradition. Most home games are played at Hagan Arena on the school's campus, while some games are played at the Palestra on the University of Pennsylvania campus.

Saint Joseph's major rival is Villanova University. The rivalry is known as the Holy War, although starting in 2013 both schools requested that the media refrain from using the term. The school also maintains intense rivalries with the other Philadelphia universities.

Fans of the Hawks often chant "The Hawk Will Never Die!". Since the school's undefeated regular season, this chant has gained familiarity with the team's opponents. In 2003, Sports Illustrated listed that cheer among "The 100 Things You Gotta Do Before You Graduate (Whatever the Cost)", calling it "the most defiant cheer in college sports."

Athletic facilities

John Smithson Field: Named after alum and former interim president John Smithson, the Hawks on-campus baseball field opened in 2012 on Maguire Campus. It features a synthetic surface with a dirt pitching mound and an AstroTurf 3D GameDay Grass surface. Bleacher seating capacity is 400 with much more space for standing room only.
SJU Softball Field: The softball team opened their on-campus field in 2012. It features a turf outfield and bleacher seating for 400 spectators.
Robert Gillin Jr., Boathouse: Saint Joseph's University celebrated its sesquicentennial anniversary in 2000-01. In conjunction with that celebration, the SJU Rowing Program, along with Saint Joseph's Prep, kicked off a capital campaign to finance the construction of a state-of-the-art boathouse on the Schuylkill River. The boathouse provides a permanent home for the Hawk rowing programs. In addition, it provides the university with a significant presence on Kelly Drive. Named in honor of Robert Gillin Jr., groundbreaking for the facility took place in the fall of 2001. The total cost for the project was approximately $3 million, plus an endowment fund to support ongoing operational costs.
Sweeney Field: Laid out in a natural bowl in the center of Saint Joseph's campus, Sweeney Field (formerly known as Finnesey Field) is the home field of Hawk soccer, lacrosse, and field hockey teams. Originally constructed for football and opened in 1929 with plans for an eventual 70,000-seat stadium, the field has undergone numerous changes over the years.
Tennis Complex at the Maguire Campus: The tennis team moved to the six refurbished courts on the Maguire Campus in 2009 with the first SJU Invitational.
Finnesey Courts: Adjacent to Sweeney Field stand the Finnesey Courts and home to the Hawk men's and women's tennis teams from the late 1940s until 2009. Prior to that SJU primarily played its home matches at the nearby Narberth courts. When courts were first built on campus, they were located where Bellarmine Hall now stands. Due to Bellarmine's construction in the summer of 1960, however, the Finnesey courts were torn down and rebuilt in their current location. These courts are still used by students.

Michael J. Hagan Arena: The on-campus home of the Hawks basketball teams was originally named Alumni Memorial Fieldhouse for the Saint Joseph's graduates who gave their lives in World War II. The building was officially dedicated on November 11, 1949, and two weeks later played host to its first basketball game, a 62–46 loss to Rhode Island on November 26. Following that initial setback, SJU would go on to win the next 23 games in the friendly confines of the Fieldhouse. Overall, the Hawks have compiled an impressive 305–76 record (80.0 winning percentage) on Hawk Hill. Among the highlights of the Hawks' home court advantage was a 34-game winning streak from the late 1950s to the early 1960s, an 11–0 record in 2000–01, and the unbeaten 11–0 mark as the Hawks made their perfect season run in 2003–04. All told, SJU has had only two losing records in the Fieldhouse over 57 seasons. The Fieldhouse held 3,200 fans but the arena has a capacity of 4,200. Martin Luther King Jr., spoke at the Fieldhouse in the 1960s.
Ellen Ryan Field: The Field Hockey team returned to campus after a multi-year hiatus with the addition of Ellen Ryan Field on the Maguire Campus in 2011. Ryan Field has a synthetic AstroTurf12 pitch and is situated adjacent to City Avenue.

The university also has a 240 by 120 four-court multi-purpose area for basketball, tennis, and volleyball, an indoor four-lane  jogging track, an 8-lane 25-meter indoor pool with a 300-seat observation area, four racquetball courts, locker rooms and saunas, a large fitness center, and nine outdoor tennis courts. The Maguire Campus includes another two gyms, a pool, and a weight room; this has been renamed to the O'Pake Athletic Center.

Alumni

 there are over 60,000 living alumni of Saint Joseph's who live in all 50 states and in 59 countries.

See also

 List of Jesuit sites

References

External links

Saint Joseph's Athletics website

 
Jesuit universities and colleges in the United States
Catholic universities and colleges in Pennsylvania
Universities and colleges in Philadelphia
Lower Merion Township, Pennsylvania
Philadelphia Main Line
Educational institutions established in 1851
Universities and colleges in Montgomery County, Pennsylvania
1851 establishments in Pennsylvania
West Philadelphia
Association of Catholic Colleges and Universities